NGC 2232 is a bright open star cluster in the equatorial constellation of Monoceros, centered on the star 10 Monocerotis. This is one of the nearest open clusters to the Sun, which makes it a potentially useful target for studying young stars and their transition to the main sequence.

It is a sparse cluster with twenty high–probability members. This is considered a super-solar cluster, with the components generally having a higher abundance of iron compared to the Sun. At least four cluster members display an infrared excess at a wavelength of 8μm that is suggestive of warm dust, while the A-type star HD 45435 displays a strong excess at 24μm. The latter may indicate the star is in an early evolutionary state. Only one member of the cluster appears to be chemically peculiar.

References

External links
 
 

Monoceros (constellation)
Open clusters
Gould Belt
2232